Rigoletto is a 1993 musical fantasy/drama produced for Feature Films for Families. Parts of the film were shot in Helper, Utah.

Synopsis
During the Great Depression, a wealthy, disfigured recluse named Ari Ribaldi moves into the town of Castle Gate. Shortly thereafter, the town experiences a wave of foreclosures, which the locals blame on Ribaldi. In order to prevent Ribaldi from taking her family's home, 13-year-old Bonnie Nelson goes to work as his maid. When Ribaldi discovers Bonnie likes to sing, he begins giving her music lessons. Under his tutelage, Bonnie takes first place in a singing competition.

Characters
Ari Ribaldi/Rigoletto (Joseph Paur) – a gifted singer and composer with a scarred face and a limp
Bonnie Nelson (Ivey Lloyd) – a naive and curious young girl who goes to work for Ribaldi in order to save her home.
Margie Nelson (Cynthia Jump) – mother of Bonnie and Timmy
Timmy Nelson – Bonnie's younger brother
Hans (John Huntington) – Ribaldi's butler
Kathleen Hamilton (Natalie Terry) - Bonnie's competitor in the talent contests
James McBride (Scott Wilkinson) – the town's banker who supported himself by increasing mortgage payments
Georgie Baker (Alyson Brienholt) – one of Bonnie's friends, who wants to be a singer just like Bonnie. Georgie is mocked by Kathleen and a few others due to her old, filthy clothes and shoes.
Porter Baker (Ryan Healey) – Georgie's brother, who speaks with a stutter and does not get along with his father
Elaina Papanikolas (Stephanie Paur) – a young girl for whom Ribaldi provides medical care
Gabriella (Tracey Williams) – a princess who takes singing lessons from Ribaldi and is secretly in love with him
Dallin Avery (Dalin Christiansen) – a farmer and pig enthusiast who leads an angry mob against Ribaldi
Emelda Avery (Ruth Margaret Nickerson) – Dallin's wife, confined to a wheelchair
Tommy Avery (Josh Goodwin)
Gordon Baker (Tom Nibley) – a temperamental drunk
Mr. and Mrs. Papanikolas (Frank Gerrish and Micaela Nelligan) – Elaina's parents

Reception 
Joe Leydon called the film "an odd but involving mix of elements from Beauty and the Beast, Phantom of the Opera and the original folk tale that inspired Verdi's classic opera. He concluded his Variety review with, "Despite an obviously limited budget, Rigoletto is a handsome piece of work. T.C. Christensen's color lensing and Cathren Warner's costumes are the outstanding production values".

References

External links

American children's films
1993 films
American musical films
1993 musicals
Musicals based on films
1993 fantasy films
Films shot in Utah
1990s English-language films
1990s American films